Stephen, Steve or Steven Doyle may refer to:

 Stephen Doyle (footballer) (born 1981), Australian rules footballer
 Stephen Doyle (hurler), Irish hurler
 Steve Doyle or Stephen Charles Doyle (born 1958), Welsh football midfielder
 Steve Doyle (Wisconsin politician) (born 1958)
 Steven Doyle or Edward Steven Doyle, President of the United States Chess Federation from 1984 to 1987